The Island is a 1980 American action
adventure-thriller film directed by Michael Ritchie and starring Michael Caine and David Warner. The film was based on a 1979 novel of the same name by Peter Benchley who also wrote the screenplay. It is about a savage group of pirates, made up of outcasts, thieves, and murderers, who are hidden from the outside world by an uncharted Caribbean island, and who have raided boats to sustain themselves since the 17th century.

Plot
Blair Maynard is a British-born American journalist in New York City who was once in the Navy and who decides to investigate the mystery of why so many boats disappear in the Bermuda Triangle of the Caribbean. He takes his estranged son Justin with him to Florida with the promise of a vacation to Disney World and, while fishing, both are attacked by an unkempt man and forcibly brought to an uncharted island. On the island, Blair discovers that the inhabitants are a centuries-old colony of savage French pirates.

The group has been living on the island for centuries, unseen by society (except for an English archeologist obsessively keeping their secret) and sustain themselves by raiding pleasure boats. The pirates kill whoever comes to the island; however, Blair and his son are both kept alive due to a false assumption that they are descended from Robert Maynard and a need to offset the negative effects of inbreeding. Blair is used to impregnate a female and act as a scribe for the largely illiterate group, while Justin is brainwashed to become a surrogate heir to Nau, the pirate leader. Blair struggles to escape from the island, but all attempts fail.

Blair begins his captivity as a very peaceable and civilized everyman, but he is helpless in the absence of law and the presence of the almost unlimited violence the pirates commit. Subjecting him to constant fear and abuse, the pirates fail to realize how desperate Blair is becoming as his repeated escape attempts continually fail. He eventually arranges for the pirates to come head to head with a US Coast Guard cutter, but they manage to wipe out the crew and take over the vessel. Blair sneaks aboard and, while most of the pirates are gathered on the aft deck of the ship, he discovers a deck-mounted M2 machine gun hidden underneath a tarp. He opens fire on the pirates, and continues to fire even after they are all dead.

He then learns that Nau was not on the deck. The two men then stalk each other through various parts of the decimated vessel. Blair eventually gets the upper hand and kills Nau with a flare gun. Blair and his son, who no longer desires to be a pirate and seems much more respectful of his father, are reunited.

Cast

 Michael Caine as Blair Maynard
 David Warner as Nau
 Angela Punch McGregor as Beth
 Frank Middlemass as Windsor
 Don Henderson as Rollo
 Dudley Sutton as Dr. Brazil
 Colin Jeavons as Hizzoner
 Jeffrey Frank as Justin Maynard
 Zakes Mokae as Wescott
 Brad Sullivan as Stark
 Reg Evans as Jack "The Bat"

Production
Richard Zanuck and David Brown paid Benchley $2.15 million for film rights to the novel and a first draft screenplay, as well as a guarantee of 10 percent of the gross, five percent of the soundtrack sales, and approval of the crew and locations, which at the time was the largest amount ever paid for film rights to any book. Benchley later claimed that he could have been able to retire if the film was more successful. Brown said the budget was $12 million plus 25% overhead but other reports put it over $20 million. The film was mostly shot on the islands of Antigua and Abaco, and the United States Coast Guard cutter Dauntless stands in for the fictitious USCGC New Hope in the movie. Some scenes were also shot in the British West Indies and Florida at Miami and Fort Lauderdale.

Australian Angela Punch McGregor was cast after Michael Ritchie saw her in Newsfront.

Release

Home media 
On July 27, 2011, Universal Studios Home Entertainment released the film on DVD as part of its Universal Vault Series as an Amazon exclusive. On December 11, 2012, Shout! Factory released a retail Blu-ray Disc/DVD combo pack of the film.

Reception

Box office
The film performed poorly at the box office, earning $15 million on the budget of $22 million.

Critical reception
Author and film critic Leonard Maltin awarded the film a BOMB, his lowest rating, calling it "[an] Absolutely awful thriller", and criticized Warner's casting as "the most normal guy on the island". Donald Guarisco from Allmovie gave the film a more positive review, calling Benchley's script "dark and witty, with gruesome violence, black humor". Guarisco summarized in his review by writing, "The Island is not for everybody but fans of big-budget oddities are likely to be fascinated by the well-funded eccentricity at play here."

Accolades 

 1st Golden Raspberry Award
 Nominated: Worst Actor (Michael Caine)
 Nominated: Worst Director (Michael Ritchie)

References

External links 
 
 
 
 
 
 

1980 films
1980s action adventure films
1980 horror films
1980s psychological thriller films
American action adventure films
American action horror films
American psychological thriller films
American adventure thriller films
American horror thriller films
Films about journalists
Films based on American novels
Films based on adventure novels
Films based on thriller novels
Films set in the Caribbean
Films set on islands
Pirate films
Adventure horror films
Universal Pictures films
Films scored by Ennio Morricone
Films directed by Michael Ritchie
Films produced by Richard D. Zanuck
Films produced by David Brown
Films based on works by Peter Benchley
Films shot in Antigua and Barbuda
Films shot in the Bahamas
The Zanuck Company films
Films shot in Miami
Films shot in Florida
Films set in Florida
Films set in New York City
Films set in Miami
Films set in the Bermuda Triangle
1980s English-language films
1980s American films